Martín Rivas may refer to:
Martín Rivas (footballer, born 1977), former Uruguayan footballer
Martiño Rivas (born 1985), also known as Martín Rivas, Spanish actor
Martín Rivas (footballer, born 1992), Uruguayan footballer
Martín Rivas Texeira (born 1969), Peruvian politician and lawyer
Martín Rivas (film), a 1925 Chilean silent film
Martín Rivas (novel), an 1862 novel by Alberto Blest Gana
Martín Rivas (TV series), a Chilean telenovela